The Eswatini Rugby Union is the governing body for rugby union in Eswatini. t was founded in 1995 and organises and oversees local and international rugby involving Eswatini. Eswatini Rugby Union became affiliated to World Rugby in 1998.

References

External links
 Official Site

Rugby union governing bodies in Africa
Rugby union in Eswatini
Sports governing bodies in Eswatini
Sports organizations established in 1995